Sallanches Aerodrome or Sallanches Mont-Blanc Aerodrome, formerly , was an airport in Sallanches, a commune in Haute-Savoie, France. It was permanently closed on the 1st September 2020.

References 

Airports in Auvergne-Rhône-Alpes
Buildings and structures in Haute-Savoie